Henri Arnaud Antchouet Rebienot (born 2 August 1979), known as Antchouet, is a Gabonese former footballer who last played the for French club FC Gobelins.

Nicknamed "The Arrow" due to his agility, the striker spent most of his professional career in Portugal and played in five other countries abroad. From 2007 to 2009 he served a ban due to doping.

Club career
Born in Libreville, Antchouet started his career at the age of 15 in local club FC 105 Libreville. After a quick spell in Cameroon he moved to Portugal, first with Leixões SC (then in the third division), and remained there for the vast majority of the following six years. He have had advanced positions among the top scorers in 2002–03 Primeira Liga with 9 goals, 2003–04 season with 10 goals and 2004–05 season with 12 goals.

Consistent performances for Primeira Liga's C.F. Os Belenenses attracted the attention of Deportivo Alavés in July 2005, but Antchouet left Spain after only a few months, returning to Portugal with Vitória de Guimarães, on loan.

After a loan in Saudi Arabia, Antchouet joined AEL 1964 FC in Greece, in January 2007, still owned by Alavés, and helped the team win the domestic cup, netting the winner against Panathinaikos F.C. just eight minutes from time, as a substitute. On 15 June 2007, however, he was given a two-year ban by the Hellenic Football Federation, after testing positive for cocaine.

In August 2009 Antchouet returned to active and Portugal, signing with second division side G.D. Estoril Praia. After one season, he was due to change clubs – and countries – again, joining FC U Craiova from Romania in June 2010; however, the deal eventually fell through and he returned to the country he had left, moving to Moreirense F.C. in division two.

In June 2011 Antchouet signed for Indian club Churchill Brothers SC, scoring on his debut against Shillong Lajong F.C. and finding the net against the same rival on 18 December in a 6–0 routing. He finished the season as joint-sixth top scorer, helping his team to the third position in the I-League.

International career
Antchouet made his senior international debut for Gabon national team on 27 February 1999 against South African in 2000 African Cup of Nations qualification match, which ended as a 4-1 defeat. He scored his first goal against Equatorial Guinea in an international friendly match in 1999.

He has also represented Gabon in competitions like 2000 ACN, 2004 ACN and 2013 African Cup of Nations main stages alongside 2002, 2006 and 2014 FIFA World Cup qualifiers.

Between 1999 and 2012, he appeared in 24 international matches for his country, scoring 3 goals.

International goals
Scores and results list Gabon's goal tally first.

Club statistics

Honours
Leixões
Taça de Portugal: Runner-up 2001–02
Supertaça Cândido de Oliveira: Runner-up 2002

AEL 1964
Greek Football Cup: 2006–07

Churchill Brothers
I-League: 2012–13
Federation Cup: 2013–14

References

External links

1979 births
Living people
Sportspeople from Libreville
Gabonese footballers
Association football forwards
FC 105 Libreville players
Canon Yaoundé players
Primeira Liga players
Liga Portugal 2 players
Segunda Divisão players
Leixões S.C. players
C.F. Os Belenenses players
Vitória S.C. players
G.D. Estoril Praia players
Moreirense F.C. players
La Liga players
Deportivo Alavés players
Saudi Professional League players
Al-Shabab FC (Riyadh) players
Super League Greece players
Athlitiki Enosi Larissa F.C. players
I-League players
Churchill Brothers FC Goa players
Paris 13 Atletico players
Gabon international footballers
2000 African Cup of Nations players
Gabonese expatriate footballers
Expatriate footballers in Cameroon
Expatriate footballers in Portugal
Expatriate footballers in Spain
Expatriate footballers in Saudi Arabia
Expatriate footballers in Greece
Expatriate footballers in India
Expatriate footballers in France
Gabonese expatriate sportspeople in Cameroon
Gabonese expatriate sportspeople in Portugal
Gabonese expatriate sportspeople in Spain
Gabonese expatriate sportspeople in Saudi Arabia
Gabonese expatriate sportspeople in Greece
Gabonese expatriate sportspeople in India
Gabonese expatriate sportspeople in France
Doping cases in association football
21st-century Gabonese people